The 2009 If Stockholm Open was a men's tennis tournament played on indoor hard courts. It was the 41st edition of the event known that year as the If Stockholm Open, and was part of the ATP World Tour 250 Series of the 2009 ATP World Tour. It was held at the Kungliga tennishallen in Stockholm, Sweden, from 17 October through 25 October 2009. Unseeded Marcos Baghdatis won the singles title.

ATP entrants

Seeds

 seeds are based on the rankings of October 12, 2009

Other entrants
The following players received wildcards into the singles main draw:
  Andreas Vinciguerra
  Joachim Johansson
  Grigor Dimitrov

The following players received entry from the qualifying draw:
  Michael Berrer
  Arnaud Clément
  Henri Kontinen
  Frederik Nielsen

The following players received entry as a Lucky loser:
  Giovanni Lapentti

Finals

Singles

 Marcos Baghdatis defeated  Olivier Rochus, 6–1, 7–5
It was Baghdatis' first title of the year and 3rd of his career.

Doubles

 Bruno Soares /  Kevin Ullyett defeated  Simon Aspelin /  Paul Hanley, 6–4, 7–6(7–4)

References

External links
 Official website 

 
2009 ATP World Tour
2009
October 2009 sports events in Europe
2000s in Stockholm
OPen